|}

This is a list of Legislative Council results for the Victorian 1982 state election. 22 of the 44 seats were contested.

Results by province

Ballarat

Bendigo

Boronia

Central Highlands

Chelsea

Doutta Galla

East Yarra 

 Two party preferred vote was estimated.

Geelong 

 Two party preferred vote was estimated.

Gippsland

Higinbotham

Melbourne 

 Two party preferred vote was estimated.

Melbourne North

Melbourne West 

 Two party preferred vote was estimated.

Monash 

 Two party preferred vote was estimated.

North Eastern

North Western

Nunawading

South Eastern

Templestowe

Thomastown

Waverley

Western

See also 

 1982 Victorian state election
 Members of the Victorian Legislative Council, 1982–1985

References 

Results of Victorian state elections
1980s in Victoria (Australia)